The 2015–16 Hellenic Football League season was the 63rd in the history of the Hellenic Football League, a football competition in England.

Premier Division

Premier Division featured 15 clubs which competed in the division last season, along with five new clubs:
Clubs promoted Division One East:
Brackley Town Saints
Wokingham & Emmbrook
Clubs promoted Division One West:
Longlevens
Lydney Town
Tuffley Rovers

Also, Wootton Bassett Town changed name to Royal Wootton Bassett Town.

Three clubs have applied for promotion to Step 4: Flackwell Heath, Kidlington and Thatcham Town.

League table

Division One East

Division One East featured ten clubs which competed in the division last season, along with four new clubs:
Bicester Town, reformed club
Holyport, relegated from the Premier Division
Reading Town, relegated from the Premier Division
Wantage Town reserves, transferred from Division One West

Also, Woodley Town changed name to Woodley United.

League table

Division One West

Division One West featured eleven clubs which competed in the division last season, along with three new clubs:
Cheltenham Saracens, relegated from Premier Division
Easington Sports, transferred from Division One East
Shrivenham, relegated from Premier Division

League table

Division Two East

Division Two East featured 9 clubs which competed in the division last season, along with 2 new clubs:
 Milton United reserves
 Sandhurst Town reserves

League table

Division Two West

Division Two West featured 10 clubs which competed in the division last season, along with 3 new clubs:
Moreton Rangers, joined from the Gloucestershire Northern Senior League
Purton reserves
Cheltenham Saracens reserves, rejoined the League

League table

References

External links
 Official Site
 Hellenic League at Full-Time TheFA.com

2015-16
9